Blastesthia posticana is a moth of the family Tortricidae. It is found from northern and central Europe to eastern Russia.

The wingspan is 11–16 mm. The head bears yellow hairs, the thorax with dark hairs. The forewings are variegated grey-brown variegated, and the wing tip has a reddish ochre base colour. The hindwings are light grey-brown.

Adults are on wing in May and June. There is one generation per year.

The larvae feed on Pinus sylvestris. It can occasionally become a nuisance, but is not considered a serious pest. The larvae show preference for small buds.

External links
Eurasian Tortricidae

Eucosmini
Tortricidae of Europe
Moths described in 1839